Sydney Kamin Sadick (born February 2, 1994) is an American on-air fashion and entertainment commentator. She regularly contributes to news and entertainment programs across the United States. Shows include Hoda & Jenna, E! News, Inside Edition, NBC New York Live, Good Day New York, Good Day LA, Fox's Top 30, ABC's Good Morning Washington and ABC's The Jam Chicago. Upcoming scheduled appearances include E! and The Today Show with Hota Kotb and Jenna Bush Hager.  She is a former editor at the Daily Front Row  and is a contributing writer to Hamptons Magazine, and has a weekly column “Sadick Files.”

Early life 
Sadick was born in New York City. She is the daughter of dermatologist Neil Sadick and Amy Kamin, former CEO of Endymed, Inc. She attended The Hewitt School from kindergarten through 12th grade. She earned her bachelor's degree in journalism from the George Washington University's School of Media and Public Affairs. She was a member of the AEPHI sorority.

Career 
Sadick's career began when she was just a junior in high school, when she attended Harvard University's summer program. She took two college-level journalism courses and was required to start a blog. Her assignment quickly grew into a daily writing career with her fashion blog, Style Solutions.  When returning to NYC she interviewed hundreds of celebrities and designers, her first being Rihanna.

The following summers during college Sadick had various high-profile internships including with Rachel Zoe, Inc. and O, The Oprah Magazine. Her next was an internship at the Daily Front Row in 2010 that led to an 8-year tenure at the company. She freelanced throughout college and became an editor upon graduation in 2016. She was responsible for writing thousands of articles both online and print, and has interviewed some of the most coveted designers and celebrities: Kim Kardashian, David Beckham, The Chainsmokers, Tom Brady, Sofia Vergara, Diane Von Furstenberg, Oscar de la Renta, Heidi Klum, Maria Sharapova, Carrie Underwood, Kylie Jenner, among many others. She has covered the Met Ball, New York Fashion Week, the CFDA Awards, and more high-profile industry and society events.

Sadick made her television debut on Amazon's digital show Style Code Live with host Franke Grande, where she was a style contributor. This led to being a regular  contributor to NBC's New York Live, Fox's Top 30, and The Jam.  She is also regularly on Hoda & Jenna, E! News, Inside Edition, Doctor & the Diva, Good Morning Washington, Good Day LA, Good Day NY, and more. She has made over 65 television appearances since 2017.   Sadick has appeared on the Lifetime show, Project Runway

Sydney was named a broadcast spokesperson for Olay's red jar products. She appeared in segments in taxi cabs across New York, Chicago, Los Angeles, Philadelphia. Washington DC, Dallas, New Orleans, Miami, and other cities. She also was featured in Direct TV segments.

Sadick has hosted and appeared at major industry events and parties, including a Millennial Pink Party in the Hamptons. the New York Botanical Garden's Winter Wonderland Ball, and her own 25th birthday party in Palm Beach, Florida.

Other ventures 
In addition to Sadick's television work, she works with well known brands on events and social partnerships to help drive sales and garner in-store buzz, social media and brand awareness. Her clients include: Schutz, De Beers, Rebag, Furla, Ramy Brook, Kendra Scott, Intermix, Cutera, Alice and Olivia, American Express Wardrobe App, among others.

On September 15, 2020, Sadick releases her first book, "Aim High: How to Style Your Life and Achieve Your Goals."

Personal life 
Sadick is single and resides in New York City.  She spends time at homes in the Hamptons and Palm Beach, Florida where she enjoys time with her family.

References 

1994 births
Living people